Michael Schultz (born 30 May 1993) is a German professional footballer who plays as a centre-back for  club Viktoria Köln.

Career
Schultz made his debut in the 3. Liga for Waldhof Mannheim on 21 July 2019, starting in the home match against Chemnitzer FC which finished as a 1–1 draw.

On 12 January 2023, Schultz returned to Viktoria Köln.

References

External links
 
 

1993 births
Living people
People from Landau
Footballers from Rhineland-Palatinate
German footballers
Association football central defenders
Karlsruher SC II players
1. FC Kaiserslautern II players
SV Waldhof Mannheim players
Eintracht Braunschweig players
FC Viktoria Köln players
2. Bundesliga players
3. Liga players
Regionalliga players